Anneliese Schönnenbeck (1919-2020) was a German film editor. She was married to fellow editor Helmuth Schönnenbeck.

Selected filmography
 Große Freiheit Nr. 7 (1944)
 Tell the Truth (1946)
 And If We Should Meet Again (1947)
 Blocked Signals (1948)
 The Trip to Marrakesh (1949)
 King for One Night (1950)
 The Disturbed Wedding Night (1950)
 Love on Ice (1950)
 My Friend the Thief (1951)
 Poison in the Zoo (1952)
 Young Heart Full of Love (1953)
 Scandal at the Girls' School (1953)
 Salto Mortale (1953)
 Portrait of an Unknown Woman (1954)
 Hungarian Rhapsody (1954)
 Sky Without Stars (1955)
 Ludwig II (1955)
 If We All Were Angels (1956)
 Love from Paris (1957)
 Two Bavarians in the Jungle (1957)
 A Piece of Heaven (1957)
 A Song Goes Round the World (1958)
 Labyrinth (1959)
 The Hero of My Dreams (1960)
 Agatha, Stop That Murdering! (1960)

References

Bibliography 
 Langford, Michelle. Directory of World Cinema: Germany. Intellect Books, 2012.

External links 
 

1919 births
2020 deaths
German film editors
German women film editors
German centenarians
Women centenarians